Malindi District was a former administrative district in the Coast Province of Kenya. Its capital was the coastal town of Malindi. When it was eliminated and merged into Kilifi County in 2010, the district had a population of 544,303 . Malindi Town is increasingly becoming known as Kenya’s version of "Little Italy". Italians now own more than 2,500 properties,  and the number of Italian residents in Malindi town and its environs, estimated at slightly over 3,000, is the largest European population compared to other European populations anywhere in Kenya.

Overview
The Italian embassy is the only foreign mission with a resident consul in Malindi to aid its population. In the preelections held in November 2007 for the Kenyan general election, 2007 Mr. Amason Jeffah Kingi, an Advocate of the High Court, was elected as a Member of Parliament for the Magarini Parliamentary constituency and Mr. Gideon Mung'aro, the former Mayor of Malindi, was elected as a member of Parliament for the Malindi constituency. Mr. Amason Kingi was consequently appointed to the cabinet where he currently serves as the Minister for East African Community. Tourism is a major industry while inland areas are rural.

Subdivision

Villages of Watamu and Gedi are part of the Malindi division.

Electoral constituencies
The district had two constituencies: 
Malindi Constituency
Magarini Constituency

 
Former districts of Kenya